Badu Station is a railway station at the junction of the Taiwan Railways Administration West Coast line and the Yilan line. It is the western terminus of the Yilan line and is located in Nuannuan District, Keelung, Taiwan.

History
The station was opened in 1899 during Japanese rule. In April 1914, the rail line from Keelung to Haccho (Badu) was completed. The station has served as an important transfer point between the West Coast line and the Yilan line since 1919, when the first segment of the Yilan line was built in the same year.

The  occurred in March 1947, as a part of anti-government protests known as the February 28 incident. Civilians began protesting at Badu railway station on 1 March 1947 the government response to the events of the previous day, and attacked National Revolutionary Army servicemen. Military forces returned ten days later, killing between five and eight station employees, while also removing at least eight more from their posts. The latter group vanished without a trace.

The current station building was completed in 1986, and a memorial to the victims of the February 28 incident was unveiled outside the station in 1994. Now it is one of the busiest stations in southern Keelung, with more than 5,000 passengers per day as of 2014.

Platform layout

See also
 List of railway stations in Taiwan

References

External links
TRA Badu Station
Taiwan Railways Administration

1899 establishments in Taiwan
Railway stations in Keelung
Railway stations opened in 1899
Railway stations served by Taiwan Railways Administration